A cloud is a visible mass of condensed droplets or frozen crystals suspended in the atmosphere.

Cloud(s) may also refer to:

Arts, entertainment, and media

Fictional characters
Cloud Strife, a character from Final Fantasy VII
Bou Keng Wan or Cloud, a character in Fung Wan

Literature
Clouds, a 1977 philosophical comedic play by Michael Frayn
The Clouds, a comedy play by Aristophanes, originally produced at the City Dionysia in 423 BC
The Clouds, a 1797 play by Richard Cumberland
The Clouds (Las nubes), a 1997 novel by Juan José Saer

Music

Cloud (music), a sound mass consisting of statistical clouds of microsounds
Clouds (60s rock band), a Scottish music group
The Clouds (Australian band), an indie rock group in the 1990s 
The Clouds (Scottish band), an indie pop band from the 1980s 
The Clouds (Manchester band), an indie pop band from the 1990s

Classical and jazz compositions
Clouds, a composition by Berthold Goldschmidt
Clouds, a composition by Charles Griffes
Clouds, a composition by Ned Rorem
"The Clouds" (composition)

Albums
Clouds (Apollo Brown album) (2011)
Clouds (EP), an EP by Nosound
Clouds (Gaussian Curve album) (2015)
Clouds (Joni Mitchell album) (1969)
Clouds (Lee Ranaldo album) (1997)
Clouds (Tiamat album) (1992)
Clouds (The Mixtape), a mixtape by NF (2021)

Songs 
 "Cloudy" (song), a song by Simon & Garfunkel
 "Clouds" (Zach Sobiech song)
 "Both Sides, Now" or "Clouds", a song by Joni Mitchell
 "Clouds", a song by Chaka Khan from Naughty
 "Clouds", a song by Level 42 from Retroglide
 "Clouds", a song by One Direction from Four
 "Clouds", a song by Redrama (feat. A. J. McLean) from Reflection
 "Clouds", a song by Spires That in the Sunset Rise from This Is Fire
 "Clouds", a track by Slayyyter from her album Troubled Paradise
 "Clouds", a 2013 song by Travis Garland from Travis Garland
 "Clouds" (NF song), 2021
 "Clouds", a 2020 song by Steps from the album What the Future Holds
 "Cloudy", a song by Average White Band from Cut the Cake

Other uses in arts, entertainment, and media
Cloud (video game), a 2005 third-person computer puzzle game
Clouds (2000 film), an American film by Don Thompson
Clouds (2020 film), an American drama film by Justin Baldoni

Information technology
Cloud (operating system), an operating system by Good OS
Cloud computing, Internet-based development and use of computer technology stored on servers rather than the client computers
Cloud storage, a model of networked online storage
Cloud.com, software developer of Apache CloudStack
Google Cloud, a name used by Google for several different offerings from time to time

People with the name
Cloud (dancer) (born 1983), American dancer
Cloud (surname)
Clodoald or Cloud (522–560), son of King Chlodomer of Orleans

Places
Cloud County, Kansas
Clouds, Tennessee, an unincorporated community
Saint Cloud, Minnesota
Saint-Cloud, a commune in the western suburbs of Paris, France

Other uses
CLOUD Act (the Clarifying Lawful Overseas Use of Data Act), a United States federal bill 
CLOUD experiment, to investigate the microphysics between galactic cosmic rays and clouds
Clouds House, a country house in Wiltshire, England
Fascinator or cloud, a lightweight head-wrap

See also
Cloudberry
Cloud Nine (disambiguation)
Google Cloud
Red Cloud (disambiguation)
St. Cloud (disambiguation)
The Cloud (disambiguation)
White Cloud (disambiguation)